Oostende railway station (IATA code: ZGJ), officially Oostende, is a railway station in Ostend, West Flanders, Belgium. It is operated by the National Railway Company of Belgium (NMBS/SNCB).

History

The first station in Ostend was opened in 1838 during the reign of King Leopold I on the former Belgian railway line 62 to Torhout and is now a supermarket.

The current station was opened in 1913 during the reign of King Albert I. It is designed to connect trains and ferries and is built with Scottish granite, bluestone from Soignies and limestone from Euville. It is constructed in a neoclassical style inspired by the French 18th-century architect François Mansart and the Louis XVI style.

The station was served by a daily Thalys high-speed rail service to Paris between 1998 and 31 March 2015.

Train services
Oostende railway station is a major hub on the National Railway Company of Belgium (NMBS/SNCB) network with frequent InterCity trains serving Brugge railway station, Gent-Sint-Pieters, Brussels-South and Liège-Guillemins on Belgian railway line 50A.  Connecting InterCity trains run to Antwerpen and Kortrijk.

The station is served by the following services:

Intercity services Ostend - Bruges - Gent - Brussels - Leuven - Liege - Eupen
Intercity services Ostend - Bruges - Gent - Sint-Niklaas - Antwerpen
Intercity services Ostend - Bruges - Kortrijk - Zottegem - Brussels - Brussels Airport

Kusttram

Ostend is a major hub on the Kusttram which is the coastal tramway run by De Lijn.

Cycling
To encourage cycling the station has an extensive number of cycling racks.

Former ferries

Regie voor Maritiem Transport used to run services connecting to the Port of Dover connecting with Network SouthEast trains from Dover Western Docks to London Victoria and London Charing Cross stations. These ceased in 1994. In the past ferries operated to Folkestone Harbour connecting with Folkestone Harbour station boat trains to London Victoria and London Charing Cross.

Gallery

See also
 List of railway stations in Belgium

References

External links

Railway stations in Belgium
Railway stations in West Flanders
Ostend
Railway stations in Belgium opened in 1838